The City of Armadale in Perth, Western Australia  was originally established on 14 December 1894 as the Kelmscott Road District, with a chairman and councillors, under the District Roads Act 1871. It was renamed "Armadale-Kelmscott Road District" on 24 March 1910. With the passage of the Local Government Act 1960, all road districts became Shires, with a president and councillors, effective 1 July 1961. On 1 July 1979, the Shire of Armadale-Kelmscott became the Town of Armadale, with a mayor and councillors, and on 15 November 1985 it became a City.

Armadale-Kelmscott Road District

Shire of Armadale-Kelmscott

Town of Armadale

City of Armadale

References

Lists of local government leaders in Western Australia
City of Armadale